Literaturpreis der Universitätsstadt Marburg und des Landkreises Marburg-Biedenkopf is a literary prize of Hesse.

Winners 
2005
Antje Rávic Strubel (Berlin) (Roman Tupolew 134) Hauptpreisträgerin 7.500 €
Jan Kuhl (Gießen) (Kinderbuch König Fittipaldi und das Zauberkissen) Regiopreis 2.500 €
2002
Thomas Lang (München) (Roman Than) – Hauptpreisträger 10.000 €
Markus Orths (Karlsruhe) (Roman Corpus) – Förderpreis 5.000 €
2000
Sibylle Berg (Zürich) (Roman Amerika)
Kathrin Groß-Striffler (Isling) (Erzählband Unterholz) – beide Hauptpreisträgerinnen je 13.000 DM
Tobias Grüterich (Dresden) (Löss. Aphorismen) Förderpreis 4.000 DM
1998
Dorothea Dieckmann (Hamburg) (die schwere und die leichte Liebe)
Matthias Altenburg (Frankfurt/M) (Landschaft mit Wölfen) – Hauptpreisträger je 15.000,00 DM
1996
Anne Duden (Berlin)
Ilija Trojanow (München) – beide Hauptpreisträger je 12.500,00 DM
Hans Wolf (Baden-Baden) – Übersetzerpreis: 10.000,00 DM
1994
Robert Menasse (Wien)
Reinhard Jirgl (Berlin) – beide Hauptpreisträger je 12.500,00 DM
Ilse und Günter Ohnemus (München) – Übersetzerpreis: 10.000,00 DM
1992
Durs Grünbein (Berlin) – Hauptpreisträger
Robert Schindel (Wien) – Förderpreis
Eckhard Thiele (Berlin) – Übersetzerpreis
1990
Helga M. Novak (Berlin) – Hauptpreisträgerin
Josef Guggenmos (Irsee) – Förderpreis
Jürgen K. Hultenreich (Berlin) – Förderpreis
Lutz Rathenow (Berlin) – Förderpreis
1988
James Krüss – Hauptpreisträger
Margrit Irgang (München) – Förderpreis
Ror Wolf (Wiesbaden) – Förderpreis
Johanna und Günter Braun (Magdeburg) – Förderpreis
1986
Hans Joachim Schädlich (Berlin) – Hauptpreisträger
Dante Andrea Franzetti (Schweiz) – Förderpreis
Christa Moog (Berlin) – Förderpreis
Ernest Wichner (Berlin) – Förderpreis
1984
Erich Loest (Osnabrück) – Hauptpreisträger
Bettina Blumenberg (München) – Förderpreis
Klaus Hensel (Frankfurt/M) – Förderpreis
Joseph Zoderer (Terenten/Südtirol) – Förderpreis
1982
Ludwig Harig (15.000 DM)
Hans Georg Bulla (7.500 DM)
Jürgen Fuchs (7.500 DM)
Tezer Kiral (7.500 DM)
1980
Harald Kaas (München) – Hauptpreis 12.000 DM
Oskar Pastior (Berlin)
Gert Jonke
Elfriede Czurda
Rosemarie Schering – Förderpreise je 6.000 DM

Literary awards of Hesse